Established in 1931, the Herald of the Russian Academy of Sciences (Vestnik Rossiiskoi Akademii Nauk) is a monthly peer-reviewed academic journal published by MAIK Nauka/Interperiodica and Springer Science+Business Media. It covers major contributions, speeches, and presentations to the Russian Academy of Sciences from both Russian and foreign academics. Subjects encompass natural, technical, and social sciences, as well as education, the environment, the value of scientific knowledge, and researchers' relationship to society. Since April 2018, the editor-in-chief is Alexey Khokhlov (one of the Vice-Presidents of the Russian Academy of Sciences).

Editors-in-chief 

 acad. V.P. Volgin (1931—1935, 1945-1951)
 acad. N.P. Gorbunov (1936—1937)
 acad. V. L. Komarov (1937—1945)
 acad. S. I. Vavilov (1945, acting)
 acad. A. N. Nesmeyanov (1951—1953)
 acad. K. V. Ostrovityanov (1953—1963)
 acad. V. A. Kirillin (1963—1965)
 acad. N. M. Sissakian (1965—1966)
 acad. M. D. Millionshchikov (1966—1973)
 acad. P. N. Fedoseev (1973-1974, acting)
 acad. V. A. Kotelnikov (1974—1987)
 acad. I. M. Makarov (1988—1997)
 acad. N. A. Plate (1997—2002)
 acad. Yu. S. Osipov (2002—2013)
 acad. V. E. Fortov (2014—2018)
 acad. A. R. Khokhlov (since 2018)

Abstracting and indexing 
The journal is abstracted and indexed in:
 Current Contents/Physical, Chemical and Earth Sciences
 Science Citation Index Expanded
 Scopus
 Chemical Abstracts Service
 CSA Illumina
According to the Journal Citation Reports, the journal has a 2020 impact factor of 0.560.

References

External links 

Springer Science+Business Media academic journals
Nauka academic journals
Multidisciplinary academic journals
Monthly journals
Publications established in 1931
English-language journals
Russian-language journals
1931 establishments in the Soviet Union
Russian Academy of Sciences academic journals